Digital Accessible Information System (DAISY) books can be heard on standalone DAISY players, computers using DAISY playback software, mobile phones, and MP3 players (with limited navigation). DAISY books can be distributed on a CD/DVD, memory card or through the Internet.

A computerized text DAISY book can be read using refreshable Braille display or screen-reading software, printed as Braille book on paper, converted to a talking book using synthesised voice or a human narration, and also printed on paper as large print book. In addition, it can be read as large print text on computer screen.

Software players 
Software-based players include, in alphabetical order:

 AMIS - Adaptive Multimedia Information System: an open-source self-voicing player for Windows that works with several screen readers; available many languages; developed by the DAISY Consortium "(Accouding to the DAISY Consortium website, AMIS is now archived and is no longer being developed or supported)"  
 Android Daisy ePub Reader: an opensource project for the Android platform
 AnyDaisy Firefox Extension, by Benetech 
 ButtercupReader: a web-based silverlight application for DAISY 3 books
 CUCAT Olearia, an open-source DAISY reader for Mac OS X (2008) 
 DAISY Book Reader, open-source player for the GNOME desktop (GTK) 
 Daisy Delight: open-source player for DAISY 2.02, for Mac OS X and Unix-based systems (2008) 
 daisy-player, an open source, multilingual, ncurses-based program for Linux to play DAISY books from the command line
 DaisyDuck: a free player for Daisy 2.02 audio books 
 DAISYPlayer: free player for Microsoft Windows; only available in Spanish 
 DaisyWorm: player for DAISY 2.02 (2002) and DAISY 3 (2005), for iPhone, iPod touch and iPad; iOS 4 or higher
 Darwin Reader for Android reads DAISY 2.02 and 3.0 text and audio books
 Dolphin EasyReader and EasyReader Express, commercial e-book reader with support for DAISY, unprotected ePub and other formats, for Microsoft  Windows 
 Dorina DAISY Reader (DDReader+): an open source, free software for Windows, reads only DAISY 3.0, available in English, Spanish and Portuguese 
 emerson-reader, an open-source and cross-platform (Linux, Mac OS X, Windows) Epub and DAISY player (2010). Requires Java 
 FSReaderDAISY Player Software for PAC Mate and Desktop; supports DAISY 2 and DAISY 3 
 Go Read: an open source DAISY reader for Android devices  
 GoDaisy: online DAISY player, in Swedish 
 InDaisy Reader, a player for iPhone and iPod, accessible with VoiceOver; supports Daisy 2.02 and Daisy 3 
 Kolibre Vadelma, an open source DAISY 2.02-player supporting DAISY Online. Downloads and build instructions available for the Raspberry Pi-platform, compile instructions available for Debian Linux.
 MAX DaisyPlayer, a free player for Microsoft Windows.
 Mobile DAISY Player, a commercial player for Symbian phones 
 Pratsam Reader Web, an online DAISY 2.02-player app for web browsers, supporting Chrome, Firefox, Safari, Microsoft Internet Explorer and Edge
 Pratsam Reader Win, a Microsoft Windows desktop DAISY 2.02-player a graphical user interface, integrated guiding voice, DAISY Online Delivery Protocol support and keyboard shortcuts for navigation
 Read2Go: accessible, commercial e-book reader for Apple iOS devices (iPad, iPhone, iPod Touch), specifically for books from Bookshare, an online library for people with print disabilities; developed by Benetech
 Read:OutLoud 6 (commercial; for Mac OS and Microsoft Windows) 
 Read:OutLoud Bookshare Edition
 ReadHear (commercial; for Mac OS and Microsoft Windows) 
 Simple Daisy Web Player, an open-source software program that enables users to play DAISY books in a web browser
 Texthelp Read&Write (commercial; for Mac OS and Microsoft Windows) 
 Thorium Reader. Open source. A cross platform desktop reading app, based on the Readium Desktop toolkit. Site, Source code  

Other relevant software includes:
 Daisy Uppsala Archive Project, server-side system for managing DAISY files 
 Online Daisy Delivery Technology, open-source software to deliver DAISY books online

Hardware players 

There are a wide range of hardware products available that can play DAISY content, usually in a portable form factor. Some of these devices are dedicated to playback of books, while others focus on other functionality, such as PDA or mobile Internet access, and offer DAISY playback as either a feature of the unit or as a software add-on.

A short (incomplete) list of products that have built-in support for DAISY playback includes:
 American Printing House for the Blind, Inc., Book Port Plusand Book Port DT 
 Pratsam Mobile, a portable handheld DAISY player that supports cellular networks, the DAISY Online Delivery Protocol, customized for use by the blind and visually impaired
 Victor Reader Stream, a hand-held portable DAISY player for the blind, visually handicapped and print impaired, produced by HumanWare
 Victor Reader Wave, also by HumanWare, is a portable CD player that can play DAISY content from CD media 
 BookSense, a similar, smaller unit produced by GW Micro; the advanced XT model features built-in flash memory and Bluetooth headset support for playback, as well as an FM radio
 The National Library Service for the Blind and Physically Handicapped (NLS) in the United States has developed a proprietary DAISY player designed for use by its print-disabled patrons. The player will replace the aging cassette-based distribution system.

Production systems 

Add-ins or extensions to create DAISY files from office software are also available:

 Microsoft and Sonata Software created a Save as DAISY add-in for Microsoft Word to convert Office Open XML text documents to DAISY.
 odt2daisy (OpenOffice.org Export As DAISY): an extension for Apache OpenOffice and LibreOffice that exports OpenDocument Text to DAISY XML or to Full DAISY (both XML and audio).

Other tools for DAISY production include:

 List of products by the DAISY Consortium 
 Book Wizard Producer
 DAISY Demon, an open-source shell around the DAISY Pipeline to help automate the production of DAISY talking books, MP3, ePub, Word and HTML from XML file; developed by the Open University
 DAISY Pipeline
 daisy-validator
 Dolphin Publisher
 Obi: DAISY/Accessible EPUB 3 production tool
 Pipeline GUI
 PipeOnline, a web interface for the DAISY Pipeline
 PLEXTALK Recording Software
 Pratsam Producer, a production system for producing DAISY (with or without audio), import and management of PDF and XML, content quality measuring tools, automatic export of XHTML, DTBook, EPUB or Microsoft Word documents
 Tobi: an authoring tool for DAISY and EPUB 3 talking books

References

External links 

 DAISY Consortium
 DaisyNow.Net - The first online DAISY delivery web application
 Daisy 3: A Standard for Accessible Multimedia Books

Accessible information
Audiobooks
Blindness equipment
Markup languages
XML-based standards
Open formats